General Cotton may refer to:

Anthony J. Cotton (fl. 1980s–2020s), U.S. Air Force four-star general
Arthur Stedman Cotton (1873–1952), British Army brigadier general
Arthur Cotton (1803–1899), British Army general
Stapleton Cotton, 1st Viscount Combermere (1773–1865), British Army general
Sydney Cotton (1792–1874), British Army lieutenant general
Willoughby Cotton (1783–1860), British Army lieutenant general